The Foundation for California Community Colleges is a 501(c)(3) tax-exempt nonprofit organization based in Sacramento, California. It was incorporated in 1998 by Dr. Larry Toy, the founding president and chief executive officer of the organization. The organization has annual operating revenue of over $35 million. The Foundation's mission is to benefit, support, and enhance the California Community Colleges. It is the official foundation to the California Community Colleges Chancellor's Office and Board of Governors. The Foundation's Board of Directors is currently composed of eight individuals, each serving six-year terms. Members include: Lance Izumi, Manuel Baca, James Sargen, Patricia Sullivan, Isabel Barreras, Mario Camara, Dan Noell, Alice Perez, and John Cena. 

On May 6, 2008, The Bernard Osher Foundation California awarded an upfront gift of $25 million to announce the California Community Colleges Scholarship Endowment, which is managed by the Foundation for California Community Colleges and benefits students at all 113 California Community Colleges. This is believed to be the largest donation to a public two-year college system in US history. This gift launched a three-year fundraising campaign on behalf of the Community Colleges, resulting in a $67.7 million scholarship fund that will fund at least 3,380 scholarships every year, in perpetuity.

The Foundation is actively involved in programs that improve air quality throughout the state of California, and has administered the California Department of Consumer Affairs—Bureau of Automotive Repair (BAR) Smog Check Referee program and Call Center since 2004. Referee Centers are located on 31 Community College campuses and two vocational centers, and offer students the opportunity to gain on-the-job training in the automotive industry. Over 100 students are trained through these centers each year.  The Referee program assists consumers with routine California Smog Check appointments and specialized services such as locating hard-to-find parts, certifying exemptions, and issuing cost waivers. In addition, the Foundation operates a Call Center that assists consumers in scheduling smog check appointments and answering questions about automotive smog issues.

On August 20, 2010, the Foundation announced a $10.9 million award from the United States Department of Commerce’s National Telecommunications and Information Administration for Broadband Technology Opportunities Program (BTOP) to create the California Connects program, designed to increase digital literacy and Internet usage in underserved California communities by working with the 33 Mathematics, Engineering, Science Achievement (MESA) programs in California Community Colleges Now in its second year, this program has created new jobs in California; purchased products from California and USA businesses; began the process of developing digital literacy modules for all Californians to access; and forged new relationships with government agencies, educational entities and business and industry leaders.

On February 16, 2010, the Foundation announced a grant award of $20 million arising from the Reformulated Gasoline Settlement Fund. This fund was created as a result of an antitrust class action.  The purpose of the fund is to achieve a clean air or fuel efficiency benefit for California consumers. With these funds, the Foundation administered the Vehicle Repair, Retirement and Replacement for Motorists (VRRRM) program, which helped consumers throughout California to repair, retire, or replace their high-polluting vehicles through the program’s suspension in August 2012.
 
The Foundation is the statewide non-profit supporting the California Community College system, the largest system of higher education in the nation. Incorporated in 1998, the Foundation serves as the official auxiliary to the California Community Colleges’ Board of Governors and the systemwide Chancellor’s Office. The Foundation’s programs and services reach all 113 Community Colleges and 72 districts, and several have expanded nationwide. The Foundation is a 501(c)(3) organization and receives no direct state or public support.

Services and areas of expertise
The Foundation's services include:
 Program and grant management
 Systemwide purchasing contracts
 Fiscal sponsorship
 Learning programs for at-risk students
 Workforce development programs
 Health care education solutions
 Resource development
 Endowment management
 Student scholarships and awards
 Air quality programs
 Facility research and GIS data services
 Information technology solutions

Contributions
 Since its founding in 1998, the Foundation has provided over $200 million in direct grants, support, and cost savings to colleges.
 The Foundation has contributed more than $3 million to the California Community College system.
 Since inception, the Foundation has grown its grant, contract, and fee for service revenues to over $30 million.
 From 2007-11, led by a $25 million lead gift and matching challenge from The Bernard Osher Foundation, the Foundation spearheaded a historic statewide fundraising effort, establishing the $68 million California Community Colleges Scholarship Endowment.
 The Foundation’s total investment funds are worth approximately $90 million.

Program accomplishments
The Foundation's programs reach all 113 California Community Colleges and 72 districts, and several are expanding nationwide.

 Youth Empowerment Strategies for Success programs served approximately 2,800 current and former foster youth in California in 2010–11.
 The California Connects digital literacy training program served 5,800 Mathematics, Engineering, Science Achievement (MESA) students on 33 Community College campuses.
 The Nursing Resource Center’s Centralized Clinical Placement System has increased enrollment capacity in San Francisco Bay Area nursing programs by 20 percent.
 The Career Pathway program has employed more than 3,000 students from over 150 California institutions as student assistants at state agencies and organizations.
 More than 1,000 smog check technicians have been trained through the Foundation’s Technician Training – Bureau of Automotive Repair program.
 Facilities Utilization, Space Inventory Options Net (FUSION) data has been instrumental in passing $22 billion in state and local capital construction bonds.

References

External links
Foundation for California Community Colleges official website
The Foundation for California Community Colleges' CollegeBuys program website
Smog Check Referee Program
LaunchPath Program

Non-profit organizations based in California